Swindle is a 2008 children's novel by Gordon Korman. It is a caper story about the retrieval of a valuable baseball card. The book was the first of a series, followed by Zoobreak, Framed!, Showoff, Hideout, Jackpot, Unleashed, and Jingle.

Plot 
A smart, young boy named Griffin Bing decides to invite his entire class grade over for a sleepover in an old, abandoned house that is slated to be demolished after the town's plan for using as a new space in their town to make a skate park was thrown out because of their youth. However, on the night of the sleepover, only Griffin and his best friend Ben Slovak show up. Griffin finds a vintage baseball card. The card was a 1920 Babe Ruth trading card worth $974,000. S. Wendell Palomino, or Swindle as the boys call him, stiffed them and gave Griffin only 120 dollars for the card. Griffin gave half to Ben. The boys attempt to steal the card from a safe in Palomino's shop, but it has been moved. After discovering that it is in his house, they group up with a few other people and decide to steal the card back in an elaborate heist. The team consists of Griffin, Ben, Melissa, Savannah, and Pitch, but Darren blackmails them into letting him also join the team. They steal the card, but leave a little evidence to their identity, and they are caught. However, news of Swindle's swindling comes out in the newspaper, and he does not press charges-instead, he gets a dose of karma and his shop does not see many visitors anymore. The card goes on auction, selling for 974,000 dollars, with the money eventually going to a town museum and the skate park.

Characters
Griffin Bing: a middle school student, and ringleader of the card heist. Nicknamed “The Man with the Plan”.

Ben Slovak: a middle school student, Griffin’s best friend, and lookout of the card heist. Ben becomes a lookout after revealing to Griffin that he has narcolepsy.

Savannah Drysdale: a middle school student. Savannah is great with animals and is brought onto the card heist to calm Swindle’s dog Luthor.

Antonia “Pitch” Benson: a middle school student. Pitch is an expert climber and is brought onto the card heist to bring them onto the roof of Swindle’s building.

Logan Kellerman: a middle school student. Logan is an actor who is trying to get into a commercial when he is brought onto the card heist to distract Swindle's neighbor.

Melissa Dukakis a middle school student. Melissa is a shy girl who was brought into the plan when Griffin Bing wants a girl specialized in computers.

Film
A TV movie Swindle based on the novel was released on Nickelodeon in 2013.

References

Author's page featuring

External links
Swindle at Fantastic Fiction

2008 Canadian novels
Novels by Gordon Korman
2008 children's books